ACF or acf may refer to:

Organizations

Africa
 Active Citizen Force, temporary conscripts and volunteers in the South African Army

Asia
 Adivasi Cobra Force, extremist Santal organisation in Assam
 Arab Chess Federation
 Asian Chess Federation

Australia
 Australian Chess Federation, the governing body for chess in Australia
 Australian Conservation Foundation, an Australian non-profit organisation promoting ecological sustainability

Europe
 Action contre la Faim or Action Against Hunger, a global humanitarian organization
 ACF Fiorentina, Associazione Calcio Fiorentina, Italian football club
 Army Cadet Force, British youth organisation that offers progressive military training to boys and girls aged 12 to 18
 Ateliers et Chantiers de France, defunct French shipyard
 Automobile Club de France, prestigious men's club located on Place de la Concorde in Paris

North America
 Academic Competition Federation, unincorporated non-profit organization that runs collegiate quizbowl tournaments
 Administration for Children and Families, operating unit of the US Dept of Health & Human Services
 Adventist Christian Fellowship, the collegiate ministry of the Adventist church in North America
 American Car and Foundry Company, manufacturer of railroad rolling stock since 1899, now known as ACF Industries
 American Checker Federation, a non-profit organization governing the game of American checkers in the US
 American Culinary Federation, a professional chefs' organization established in 1929

South America
 Associação Chapecoense de Futebol, a Brazilian football club

Science and technology
 Access Control Facility, the prototype of the ACF2 third-party security software for IBM OS/VS
 2-Acetylfuran, a low melting solid or high boiling liquid
 Advanced Communication Function, a family of replacement products for telecommunications programs on some IBM computers replacing IBM Network Control Program, and ACF/VTAM
 Advanced Component Framework, C++ component framework providing a scalable architecture for very complex applications
 African clawed frog, a species of South African aquatic frog of the genus Xenopus
 Algebraically closed field, abbreviated ACF when considered together as a class of models
 Anisotropic conductive film, a conductive adhesive system used in the electronics industry
 Autocorrelation function, mathematical tool used frequently in signal processing

Medicine
 ACF (gene), human gene
 Aberrant crypt foci, a preneoplastic lesion on the mucosa of colon or rectum
 Antecubital fossa, part of the triangular area on the anterior view of the elbow joint of the human arm, commonly a site for cannulation
 Asymmetric crying facies, a minor congenital anomaly

Other uses
 ACF River Basin, Apalachicola-Chattahoochee-Flint River Basin in the southeastern US
 Adult Care Facility, such as: nursing home, long-term care facility, adult daycare center, assisted living, respite care, etc.
 Saint Lucian Creole French (ISO 639:acf), a French-based creole language spoken in Saint Lucia and Dominica
 Aral Talim Airport, IATA code ACF

See also
 ACFS (disambiguation)